Jayadevan Chakkadath (born 13 January 1981) in Thrissur is a sound editor and recordist known for his works in Malayalam films. He has won National Film Award for Best Audiography in 2017 for Kaadu Pookkunna Neram Directed by Dr. Biju and won two Kerala State Film Award for Best Sound Recordist for the same film in 2017. He received a post-graduate diploma in sound recording and engineering from Satyajit Ray Film and Television Institute Kolkata in 2007. He was a faculty member at Srishti school of Arts, Design and Technology in Bangalore from 2015 to 2017. training given for location sound recording, sound design and audio narratives at under graduate level. He is an alumnus of Cochin university of science and technology in Mechanical Engineering (1998-2002).

Filmography

TV Shows

Awards
 Kerala State Film Award for Best Sound Recordist Year 2016-2017 
 National Film Award for Best Audiography Year 2016-2017

References

External links
 

1981 births
Living people
Best Audiography National Film Award winners
People from Thrissur district
Satyajit Ray Film and Television Institute alumni
Indian sound designers
21st-century Indian composers